Manfred Schwabl (born 18 April 1966) is a German former professional footballer who played as a midfielder. He made four appearances for West Germany.

Club career 
Schwabl, commonly nicknamed "Manni", was born in Holzkirchen. He appeared in more than 300 (West) German top-flight matches.

International career 
Schwabl won four caps for West Germany in the late 1980s.

Honours
 Bundesliga: 1986, 1990
 DFB-Pokal: 1986; finalist 1985

References

External links
 
 
 

1966 births
Living people
Association football midfielders
German footballers
Germany international footballers
Germany under-21 international footballers
Germany youth international footballers
FC Bayern Munich II players
FC Bayern Munich footballers
1. FC Nürnberg players
TSV 1860 Munich players
FC Tirol Innsbruck players
Bundesliga players
Austrian Football Bundesliga players
Expatriate footballers in Austria
West German footballers
People from Miesbach (district)
Sportspeople from Upper Bavaria
German expatriate sportspeople in Austria
German expatriate footballers